Kung Hei Fat Choy can refer to

Kung Hei Fat Choy (film), a Hong Kong film of 1985

The Chinese New Year